The Qasba–Aligarh massacre was an ethnic clash that erupted when recently settled armed tribal Pashtuns from KPK, Pakistan  and Afghanistan attacked densely populated civilized locals in Qasba Colony, Aligarh Colony and Sector 1-D of Orangi in Karachi in the early hours of the morning on 14 December 1986. According to official reports, around 49 people were killed (unofficial reports are significantly higher at 400) and several hundred were injured in what was perceived as a "revenge killing" by newly settled armed Pashtuns following an unsuccessful raid on a Pashtun heroin processing and distribution center in Sohrab Goth by the security forces. Most of the residents of the two colonies happened to be Muhajirs like Biharis who had been freshly repatriated from Bangladesh. 

The locality is situated within limits of Karachi city and consists of middle class Muhajir families. During planned development of the city in the 1960s and 70s it was constructed by the government as colony for journalists where amenity plots were handed out to the residents. Due to the distance from the city most allottees sold their plots moving themselves to central areas. The place was thereon heavily dominated by the muhajir community.

Background
From the time of Pakistan's independence in 1947 and up until 1961, the population of Karachi grew by 432 percent – a growth rate that "no other city anywhere else in the world [had] ever experienced". People migrating from India, commonly known as Muhajir could not be accommodated into the city properly and a vast majority of them were settled in informal housing settlements known as "kachi bastis". Resettlement of the Muhajirs could not effectively catch up with the growth of Karachi's kachi bastis as further more in-migrants arrived into the city from Punjab, Balochistan and Khyber Pakhtunkhwa.

By the late 1960s, these informal settlements had taken up two forms: unorganized settlements, where the squatters illegally occupied public or private owned land, and, illegal subdivisions, where peripheral land was developed and sold "by 'independent' private persons who lacked the property rights" over it. These informal entrepreneurs came to be known as dallals (patrons) and enjoyed a close connections with the police officers, politicians and bureaucrats, connections that offered them "a certain degree of security against illegal eviction of [other] basti dwellers".

Afghan Refugees influx and the Kalashnikov culture
During the Soviet–Afghan War in the late 1970s and early 1980s, millions of Afghan refugees had made their way into Pakistan. An estimated population of about 6 million refugees were welcomed with open arms into Pakistan as part of General Zia-ul-Haq's Islamization programme. These refugees gradually settled in populated urban centers throughout the country, including southern cities of Hyderabad and Karachi. Many of the Afghan refugees that made their way into Karachi settled in bastis at the outskirts of the city, which included areas like Sohrab Goth.

The magnitude of refugees migrating into Pakistan had a huge socio-economic impact on the country's society, promoting wide availability of illegal narcotic drugs like heroin, and automatic firearms like the AK-47 rifles. Where Pakistan had previously been drug-free and largely deweaponised, the country soon became flooded with automatic weapons along with the population of drug users shooting up to over a million in the early 1980s which came into sharp conflict with the general populace of Karachi. The sudden proliferation of firearms has since been dubbed as the "Kalashnikov culture".

Changing housing market
This influx of Afghan refugees gave rise to informal Pashtun entrepreneurs who joined in Karachi’s informal housing market. Many of the Pashtuns landed jobs as policemen and started investing in real estate while several drug and arms barons also made their way into Karachi's ethnic and political stage as a result of this influx. Every one lived side by side until the influx of Pashtuns who started stirring ethnic fault lines.

As the Punjabi and Muhajir influence grew weak in Karachi's informal housing market, the Pashtun entrepreneurs imposed greater control over the land. Pashtun gunmen would seize land by force, Pashtun real estate developers would develop on plots and rent out to tenants who could be evicted at will. Thus coercion and violence became a common modus vivendi of the afghans.

Of the few areas in Karachi where the Pashtuns were met with fierce resistance, Orangi was the largest squatter settlement in Karachi with a population of around one million. Orangi was an ethnically diverse settlement where Muhajirs and Pashtuns each constituted 25% of the population and the remainder was a mixture of Punjabis, Sindhis, Baloch, Bengalis.

Karachi's growing ethnic strife

The urban centres of Karachi and Hyderabad had increasingly become ethnically diverse and riots along ethnic lines were commonplace. The brimming ethnic conflict evolved into territorial demarcation on ethnic grounds, with power being accumulated into the hands of local criminal elements, particularly in and around areas of Orangi.

In April 1985, Karachi faced its first major ethnic riot that claimed the lives of at least a hundred people. The riot mobilised Muhajir and Bihari basti dwellers against Pashtun gunmen who had tried to extend their influence to those neighborhoods. The main battlefield was situated between Banaras Chowk and the Metro Cinema in Orangi, an area adjacent to newly settled Pashtun strongholds.

Later on the morning of 15 April 1985, another Pashtun-Muhajir ethnic clash broke out when an Afghan minivan driver struck and killed a schoolgirl, Bushra Zaidi. The Pashtun driver had been eager to outrun a competitor without respecting a traffic light, hitting a vehicle and then running into a group of students of Sir Syed Government Girls College in Liaquatabad. In the hours immediately following the incident, a mob of angry young students organised a protest demonstration which was brutally repressed by the police on the orders of Pakistan Army. Tensions between the Pashtun and Muhajir populations grew to a boiling point after the incident.

The police were later accused of molesting and raping young female students after officers entered the Sir Syed College. The alleged police brutality later fueled the anger of Muhajirs and violence erupted throughout the city all the way from Liaquatabad in the east to Orangi to the west. Eager to provoke the police, the young students set buses and minivans on fire and were inevitably met with harsh responses.

Police crackdown in Sohrab Goth
As complaints came flooding in about the increase in crime rates throughout Karachi, particularly those fueled by ethnic conflicts, newspapers began highlighting the issue in their headlines and the government of Sindh found the need for a crackdown on the various criminal elements within the afghan refugees settlements in the city. On 12 December 1986, the Sindh governor Lt Gen Jahan Dad Khan ordered a police operation in the vicinity of Sohrab Goth in Karachi. Guised as an anti-encroachment operation, a team was assembled under DC Sardar Ahmed, DIG Karachi, IGP Sindh and Corps Commander Karachi Lt Gen Ahmad Shamim Khan to root out and arrest criminal elements. They were also asked to relocate the illegal encroachers from Al-Asif Square in Sohrab Goth to a new site near the National Highway.

The police had wanted to raid a Pashtun heroin processing and distribution centre in Sohrab Goth. However, when they approached the neighborhood, they were met with violent retaliation. As part of the operation, the security forces surrounded the area with bulldozers destroying illegally encroached houses and removing the residents. Some reports also suggest that just before the operation, the police had entered adjacent Orangi townships that were predominantly Muhajir and seized caches of arms which were stored for self-defense.

The massacre at Qasba and Aligarh colonies

A group of several armed Pashtuns with Kalashnikov rifles charged down the hill overlooking the Qasba and Aligarh colonies, and Sector 1-D of Orangi Town at around 2:30pm. The invaders are said to have set people's houses on fire using kerosene tanks "under [the] cover of a hail of gunfire".

In less than two hours an estimated 400 people were murdered. Hundreds more were injured and many more escaped from the roof to save their lives. However, according to official figures, there were only 49 deaths. By , hundreds of homes were burnt to the ground by the Pashtun terrorists

Formal judicial inquiry
The former chief justice of the Supreme Court Sajjad Ali Shah conducted an inquiry into the incident and wrote in his findings or that "it [was] the worst kind of massacre [he] had ever witnessed, where women, children and men from Muhajir community were slaughtered by illegal immigrants [and] the Corps Commander Karachi should have questioned as to why the army was asked to retreat approximately two hours before the incident took place". He suggested the existence of "foul-play". The report was sent to Islamabad where he criticized the army, Sindh administration and the governor’s role in the event. The report of fact-finding mission was ignored by the establishment

In an interview with Mazhar Abbas, former Sindh chief minister Syed Ghous Ali Shah said that the judicial commission led by the chief justice was able to shed some light on the issues giving rise to the Qasba–Aligarh massacre and disclosed revealing details of negligence in the security forces. However, he confessed that the report was not brought to light because the government at the time had feared it would create more chaos.

Survivors' accounts
As per one of the survivors, "they came inside out houses and asked for men", "they killed indiscriminately with knives and guns chanting Allah’o’Akber as if we were infidels" said one of the survivors who lost her father and elder brother sobbing and she was correct. Mosques were used to mobilize people to kill and there were speeches and sermons given against the people living in Qasba Aligarh by the clerics stating that "killing them would take one to heaven".

Mohammad Ibrahim another survivor who lost his elder brother told us that "they came in and started burning our houses, kicking the babies and killing anyone in front of them …".

Citations

References

 
 
 
 
 
 
 
 
 
 
 
 

Massacres in 1986
Massacres in Pakistan
History of Karachi (1947–present)
1986 in Pakistan
Crime in Karachi
20th century in Karachi
1986 murders in Pakistan
December 1986 crimes
December 1986 events in Asia
Persecution of Muhajirs